Todd Graham Stone (born 1972) is a Canadian politician who was elected to the Legislative Assembly of British Columbia in the 2013 provincial election. He represents the electoral district of Kamloops-South Thompson as a member of the British Columbia Liberal Party. On February 7 2022, he was appointed BC Liberal house leader and Official Opposition Critic for Jobs, Economic Recovery, Trade, & Innovation.

After being elected to the 40th Parliament, Stone was appointed as the Minister of Transportation and Infrastructure. Upon reelection in the May 2017 provincial election, Stone was appointed as the Official Opposition Critic for Municipal Affairs.

In October 2017, Stone entered the race to replace Christy Clark as the Leader of the British Columbia Liberal Party. However, he lost to Andrew Wilkinson after 4 rounds of voting.

Background
He is the founder and CEO of a Kamloops-based software company. He serves on the board of the Thompson-Nicola-Cariboo United Way (though currently on leave), and served for over six years as vice-chair of the board of governors of Thompson Rivers University. He also served on the boards of the Kamloops Chamber of Commerce, Kamloops Ventures Fund (VCC) Inc., ACETECH, and the Insurance Corporation of British Columbia (ICBC). In addition, he was an active contributor to the Friends of UCC University Society and the Friends of the Kamloops Airport.

In his role as Minister of Transportation and Infrastructure, Stone increased speeding limits to 120 km/h on rural highways and introduced legislation for ticketing improper use of passing lanes.

Stone has been actively involved in the British Columbia Liberal Party since the 1990s. He has lived in both Vancouver and Victoria, and has been a Kamloops resident for 28 years. He met his wife, Chantelle, during an election campaign. As of 2017, they have been married for 17 years and have three daughters together, aged 7–13.

Electoral record

References

British Columbia Liberal Party MLAs
Living people
Members of the Executive Council of British Columbia
21st-century Canadian politicians
Year of birth uncertain
1972 births